A referendum concerning the reduction of the members of the New South Wales Legislative Assembly was put to voters on 16 December 1903, in conjunction with the 1903 federal election. The referendum was conducted on the basis of optional preferential voting. However, preferences were not counted, as an overwhelming majority voted to reduce the number of members to 90.

The question
The text of the question was:
As to what shall be the number of Members of the Legislative Assembly.
Which of the following numbers do you prefer, and what is the order of your preference?

Results
The referendum was overwhelmingly in favour of reducing the number of members to 90.

Aftermath
The referendum did not provide how the reduction of members was to occur. Parliament was recalled to decide how to give effect to the referendum, and passed the Electorates Redistribution Act 1904 which provided the districts were to be determined by three electoral districts commissioners. The proposed districts were published by the commissioners  on 18 March 1904, and the final districts were published on 22 April 1904.

See also 
 Referendums in Australia

References

1903 elections in Australia
1903 referendums
Referendums in New South Wales
December 1903 events
1900s in New South Wales